Hadrotarsus ornatus is a species of comb-footed spider in the family Theridiidae. It is found in Tasmania, and has been introduced to Belgium.

References

Theridiidae
Spiders described in 1943
Spiders of Australia